Aleksandra Rosiak (born 7 July 1997) is a Polish handballer for RK Krim and the Polish national team.

She participated at the 2018 European Women's Handball Championship.

References

External links

1997 births
Living people
People from Lubin
Polish female handball players
21st-century Polish women